Henry Wardle (1832 – 16 February 1892) was a British brewer and  Liberal politician who sat in the House of Commons from 1885 to 1892.

Wardle was born at Twyford, Berkshire, the son of Francis Wardle and his wife Elizabeth Billinge. In 1853 at the age of 21 he went into partnership with Thomas Fosbrooke Salt in the Burton upon Trent brewery Thomas Salt and Co. He was for many years active in the town's civic affairs as a Town Commissioner and then an alderman after Burton became a municipal borough in 1878. He was a J. P. for Derbyshire and Staffordshire.
 
Wardle was elected as the Member of Parliament (MP) for South Derbyshire constituency at the 1885 general election. He held the seat until his death in Burton upon Trent in 1892 aged 60.

Wardle married Thomas Fosbrooke Salt's daughter Mary Ellen Salt in 1864. They lived at Winshill. Son Thomas Erskine Wardle became a Vice-Admiral in the Royal Navy.

References

External links 

1832 births
1892 deaths
People from Twyford, Berkshire
People from Burton upon Trent
Members of the Parliament of the United Kingdom for constituencies in Derbyshire
UK MPs 1885–1886
UK MPs 1886–1892
English brewers
Councillors in Staffordshire
Liberal Party (UK) MPs for English constituencies
19th-century English businesspeople